The birth–death process (or birth-and-death process) is a special case of continuous-time Markov process where the state transitions are of only two types: "births", which increase the state variable by one and "deaths", which decrease the state by one.  The model's name comes from a common application, the use of such models to represent the current size of a population where the transitions are literal births and deaths. Birth–death processes have many applications in demography, queueing theory, performance engineering, epidemiology, biology and other areas. They may be used, for example, to study the evolution of bacteria, the number of people with a disease within a population, or the number of customers in line at the supermarket.

When a birth occurs, the process goes from state n to n + 1. When a death occurs, the process goes from state n to state n − 1. The process is specified by birth rates  and death rates .

Recurrence and transience
For recurrence and transience in Markov processes see Section 5.3 from Markov chain.

Conditions for recurrence and transience
Conditions for recurrence and transience were established by Samuel Karlin and James McGregor.

A birth-and-death process is recurrent if and only if

A birth-and-death process is ergodic if and only if

A birth-and-death process is null-recurrent if and only if

By using Extended Bertrand's test (see Section 4.1.4 from Ratio test) the conditions for recurrence, transience, ergodicity and null-recurrence can be derived in a more explicit form.

For integer  let  denote the th iterate of natural logarithm, i.e.  and for any , 
.

Then, the conditions for recurrence and transience of a birth-and-death process are as follows.

The birth-and-death process is transient if there exist   and  such that for all 

The birth-and-death process is recurrent if there exist  and  such that for all 

Wider classes of birth-and-death processes, for which the conditions for recurrence and transience can be established, can be found in.

Application

Consider one-dimensional random walk  that is defined as follows.

where  satisfy the condition .

The random walk described here is a discrete time analogue of the birth-and-death process (see Markov chain) with the birth rates 

and the death rates
.
So, recurrence or transience of the random walk is associated with recurrence or transience of the birth-and-death process.

The random walk is transient if there exist ,  and  such that for all 

The random walk is recurrent if there exist  and  such that for all

Stationary solution

If a birth-and-death process is ergodic, then there exists steady-state probabilities  where  is the probability that the birth-and-death process is in state  at time  The limit exists, independent of the initial values  and is calculated by the relations:

These limiting probabilities are obtained from the infinite system of differential equations for 

and the initial condition 

In turn, the last system of differential equations is derived from the system of difference equations that describes the dynamic of the system in a small time . During this small time  only three types of transitions are considered as one death, or one birth, or no birth nor death. For a population process, "birth" is the transition towards increasing the population size by 1 while "death" is the transition towards decreasing the population size by 1.

Examples of birth-death processes

A pure birth process is a birth–death process where  for all .

A pure death process is a birth–death process where  for all .

M/M/1 model and M/M/c model, both used in queueing theory, are birth–death processes used to describe customers in an infinite queue.

Use in phylodynamics
Birth–death processes are used in phylodynamics as a prior distribution for phylogenies, i.e. a binary tree in which birth events correspond to branches of the tree and death events correspond to leaf nodes. Notably, they are used in viral phylodynamics to understand the transmission process and how the number of people infected changes through time.

The use of generalized birth-death processes in phylodynamics has stimulated investigations into the degree to which the rates of birth and death can be identified from data. While the model is unidentifiable in general, the subset of models that are typically used are identifiable.

Use in queueing theory
In queueing theory the birth–death process is the most fundamental example of a queueing model, the M/M/C/K//FIFO (in complete Kendall's notation) queue. This is a queue with Poisson arrivals, drawn from an infinite population,  and C servers with exponentially distributed service times with K places in the queue. Despite the assumption of an infinite population this model is a good model for various telecommunication systems.

M/M/1 queue

The M/M/1 is a single server queue with an infinite buffer size. The birth and death process is an M/M/1 queue when,

The differential equations for the probability that the system is in state k at time t are

Pure birth process associated with an M/M/1 queue
We have the following system of differential equations:

That is, a (homogeneous) Poisson process is a pure birth process.

M/M/c queue

The M/M/C is a multi-server queue with C servers and an infinite buffer. It characterizes by the following birth and death parameters:

and

with

The system of differential equations in this case has the form:

Pure death process associated with an M/M/C queue
We have the following system of differential equations:

Under the initial condition  and  we obtain the solution

that presents the version of binomial distribution depending on time parameter  (see Binomial process).

M/M/1/K queue
The M/M/1/K queue is a single server queue with a buffer of size K. This queue has applications in telecommunications, as well as in biology when a population has a capacity limit. In telecommunication we again use the parameters from the M/M/1 queue with,

In biology, particularly the growth of bacteria, when the population is zero there is no ability to grow so,

Additionally if the capacity represents a limit where the individual dies from over population,

The differential equations for the probability that the system is in state k at time t are

Equilibrium

A queue is said to be in equilibrium if the steady state probabilities  exist. The parameter  is usually called load parameter or utilization parameter. Sometimes it is also called traffic intensity.

Using the M/M/1 queue as an example, the steady state equations are

This can be reduced to

So, taking into account that , we obtain

See also
 Erlang unit
 Queueing theory
 Queueing models
 Quasi-birth–death process
 Moran process

Notes

References

Queueing theory
Markov processes